Mikkelberg-Kunst-und-Cricket Center is a cricket ground in Hattstedt, Germany.  The first recorded match on the ground was held in 1991 when Denmark Women played the Netherlands Women in a fixture.  The ground later served as a venue for the two teams in four Women's One Day International, two in 1997 and two in 1998.  These are the only major international cricket matches to be held in Germany.  It is the home ground of Husum Cricket Club.

References

External links
Mikkelberg-Kunst-und-Cricket Center at ESPNcricinfo
Mikkelberg-Kunst-und-Cricket Center at CricketArchive
 Husum Cricket Club

 

Cricket grounds in Germany
Buildings and structures in Nordfriesland
1991 establishments in Germany